"Dance Little Sister" is a song by Terence Trent D'Arby, the third single from the 1987 album Introducing the Hardline According to Terence Trent D'Arby.

The single reached the UK Top 20 as well as #30 on the Billboard Hot 100 chart in 1988. As was common for big-selling artists at that time, the singles were released in a plethora of limited editions on multiple formats, including a full eight and a half minute version (entitled "Part One and Two" on some releases), and a remix by Shep Pettibone, again released in a short (3:45) and long (8:45) version.

Charts

Weekly charts

Year-end charts

References

External links
 Music video on YouTube

Terence Trent D'Arby songs
1987 singles
Songs written by Terence Trent D'Arby
CBS Records singles
Songs written by Sean Oliver
1987 songs
Funk rock songs